La Tour-de-Salvagny is a commune in the Metropolis of Lyon in Auvergne-Rhône-Alpes region in eastern France. It borders Parc de Lacroix-Laval in Marcy-l'Étoile.

See also 
Communes of the Metropolis of Lyon

References 

Communes of Lyon Metropolis
Lyonnais